Absinthe: La Folie Verte (Absinthe: The Green Madness) is a concept album by Blood Axis and Les Joyaux de la Princesse.  It is an homage to the cordial absinthe.

It was released by Athanor (Poitiers, France) in 2001 as a digipack CD. In 2002, Athanor released a special limited edition boxset of the same name.

Boxset contents
The boxset contained two 10" picture discs (with remixes of the CD's material on one disk; live recordings from the only performance of the material, in Sintra, Portugal, October 2001, on the other), an absinthe spoon with the album title punched in it, a dozen different inserts, color postcards, flyers, and a re-print of the 19th century book titled De la Liqueur d'Absinthe et des ses effets [The Liquor of Wormwood and its effects] by J. M. Ferdinand Moreau.

Precedent
Blood Axis' Gospel of Inhumanity (1996) contained the track "Absinthe" which used the same text as "Folie Verte (I Am The Green Fairy)."

The music was created by Blood Axis and LJDLP, with the participation of Eugénie Tudy (on piano, organ, and limonaire).  All aspects of the album (including instrumentation, spoken recitations, and mixing) were executed under the influence of absinthe.

The collaboration of the Musée de l'Absinthe ([Absinthe Museum], Auvers-sur-Oise) is credited.  A point is made of recognizing Madame Marie-Claude Delahaye, the museum's conservatrix.

The album combines musical soundscapes derived from Absinthe songs of the past (using elements derived from old cylinder recordings and 78s) and recitations of Absinthe-inspired poems of the fin-de-siècle (by Marie Corelli, Ernest Dowson, and Charles Cros).

Liner notes
The liner notes are replete with images of artistic representations of absinthe: advertisements for it, sheet music of absinthe-related songs, and anti-absinthe propaganda.

Quotation
"Life without absinthe?  I cannot imagine it!  For me it would be impossible!  I should hang, drown or shoot myself into infinitude, out of sheer rage at the continued cruelty and injustice of the world — but with the divine nectar of Olympus I can defy misfortune and laugh at poverty, as though they were the merest bagatelles!  Come! —to your health, mon brave! Drink with me! "  —Marie Corelli, Wormwood (1890).  Recited in "Variations Sur Le Thème De Corelli (By Venus and Cupid)."

Track listing

CD
 "Folie Verte (I Am the Green Fairy)" – 3:42
(Green Madness), lyrics by Auteur Anonyme, 1906
 "Symphonie Verte (And Here I Am, An Absintheur...)" – 4:59
(Green Symphony)
 "Minutes D'Absinthe (Let Me Be Mad, Mad with Absinthe)" – 2:00
(Minutes of Absinthe), lyrics from Corelli's Wormwood, 1890
 "Absinthia Tetra (Opaline)" – 6:58
Lyrics by Ernest Dowson
 "Poison Vert (D'Après Frédéric Barbier)" – 6:57
(Green Poison), song by Frederic Barber
 "Avec Les Fleurs... Avec L'Absinthe (With Flowers and with Women)" – 1:58
([With Flowers... With Absinthe), lyrics by Charles Cros
 "Absinthine (D'Après Émile Duhem)" – 0:55
Song music by Émile Duhem
 "Variations Sur Le Thème De Corelli (By Venus and Cupid)" – 4:05
(Variations on the Theme of Corelli), lyrics from Corelli's Wormwood, 1890
 "Variations Sur Le Thème De Corelli (That Night, I Drank Deeply)" – 13:20
(Variations on the Theme of Corelli), lyrics from Corelli's Wormwood, 1890
 "Princesse Verte (D'Après Emile Spencer)" – 5:37
(Green Princess), song music by Emile Spencer
 "Fée Verte, Vous Êtes Jolie (Chanté Par Affre)" – 2:12
(Green Fairy, You Are Pretty (Sung by Affre))

Vinyl
Studio Tracks
"La Folie Verte"
"Variations Musicales"
"Au Fond Du Verre"
"Absinthe Patriote"
"Minutes D'Absinthe"
"Avec Les Fleurs, Avec Les Femmes...Avec L'Absinthe"
"L'Oxygenee C'est Ma Sante"
"Absinthe Eternelle"
"Folie Verte"
"La Buveuse D'Asinthe"

Live Tracks
"La Folie Verte"
"Absinthia Taetra"
"Avec Les Fleurs, Avec Les Femmes..."
"Sur Le Thème De Corelli, Variations Musicales"
"Bois Ton Absinthe (De Francis Marty)"
"A Ta Santé Mon Brave"
"Fée Verte, Vous Êtes Jolie (D'Après Affre)"

External links
 Absinthe: La Folie Verte limited box-set at the label's website.
 Absinthe: La Folie Verte CD at Discogs.

Experimental music albums
2001 albums
Concept albums
Blood Axis albums